The bibliography of Charles III, King of the United Kingdom and 14 other Commonwealth Realms, is a list of approximately three dozen works which the King has written, co-written, illustrated or narrated, and includes works for which he has written a foreword, introduction or preface.

Any royalties the King receives go to The Prince's Charities Foundation, as do any profits from Duchy Originals.

Author
The Old Man of Lochnagar. Illustrated by Sir Hugh Maxwell Casson, K.C.V.O. London: Hamish Hamilton, 1980. Hardcover: .
A Vision of Britain: A Personal View of Architecture. Doubleday, 1989. Hardcover: .
Rain Forest Lecture.  Royal Botanic Gardens, 1990. Paperback: .
HRH the Prince of Wales Watercolours.  Little, Brown and Company, 1991. Hardcover: .

Co-author
 Mary Rose.  With Armand Hammer. New York: The Sarpedon Press, eds.  Photographs: Pat Baker, Christopher Dobbs, Dominic Fontana, Steve Foote.  Illustrations: Tayburn London, Arthur Barbose, Nick Evans, Debby Fulford.  Portsmouth: The Mary Rose Trust (1985).  .
Architecture & the Environment: HRH The Prince of Wales and the Earth in Balance (Architectural Design Profile). With Andreas C. Papadakis. John Wiley & Sons (1993). Paperback: .
Highgrove: An Experiment in Organic Gardening and Farming. With Charles Clover, environment editor for The Daily Telegraph, photography by Andrew Lawson. New York City: Simon & Schuster (1993). Hardcover: .
 Portrait of an Estate. With Charles Clover.  Photography by Andrew Lawson. London: A. G. Carrick. (1993). .
Princes As Patrons: The Art Collections of the Princes of Wales from the Renaissance to the Present Day: An Exhibition from the Royal Collection. With Mark Evans, Oliver Millar, National Museum and Gallery, Cardiff. Merrell Holberton (1998). Hardcover: .
The Parks and Gardens of Cornwall. With Douglas Ellory Pett. Cornwall: Alison Hodge Publishers (1998). Hardcover: .
Respect for the Earth: Sustainable Development. BBC Radio 4 Reith Lectures (2000). With Christopher Patten, et al. London: Profile Books (2000).  Paperback: .
The Garden at Highgrove. With Candida Lycett Green.  Photography by Andrew Lawson and Christopher Simon Sykes. London: Cassell & Co. (2001).  .
Watercolours and Drawings from the Collection of Queen Elizabeth the Queen Mother. With Susan Owens. Royal Collection Enterprises (2005). .
Harmony: A New Way of Looking at Our World. With Tony Juniper and Ian Skelly. Blue Door. (2010). Hardback: .
 Highgrove: A Garden Celebrated. With Bunny Guinness. London: Weidenfeld & Nicolson. (2013). Hardcover 
 Highgrove: An English Country Garden. With Bunny Guinness. London: Rizzoli International Publications. (2015). Hardcover

Illustrator
Travels with the Prince: Paintings and Drawings Selected by H.R.H. the Prince of Wales.   Imogen Lock, ed.   Framlingham: Sheeran Lock (1998). Paperback: , .

Narrator
The Prince's Choice: A Personal Selection from Shakespeare: Performed by Richard Briers & Cast.   William Shakespeare. Performed by Richard Briers, John Gielgud, Glenda Jackson, Alan Bates, Robert Lindsay, Maggie Smith, Juliet Stevenson, et al. Narrated by Charles, Prince of Wales. Selections divided into categories (e.g. extraordinary people, public life, humour). London: Hodder & Stoughton Audio Books (1995). Audio Cassette / Audiobook: , .

Foreword
More Goon Show Scripts, Spike Milligan. Sphere Books (1974) 
New Land For Old: Environmental Renaissance of the Lower Swansea Valley . Stephen J Lavender. (1981) 
To the Ends of the Earth. Sir Ranulph Fiennes. (1983) 
Airborne Free: Red Devils & Other Rare Breeds. Mark Bryant, ed. London: Leo Cooper, Octopus Books (1990).  .   Description: observations on airborne forces and wildlife management by more than fifty cartoonists: George Worsley Adamson, Barry Fantoni, Alex Graham, Martin Honeysett, Peter Maddocks, Gerald Scarfe, Bill Tidy, Kevin Woodcock et al.   Royalties to the Airborne Forces Charities Development Trust and the David Shepherd Conservation Foundation.
Village Buildings of Britain. Matthew Rice. Little, Brown (1991). .
A Countrywoman's Notes.  Rosemary Verey. London: Frances Lincoln (1993). Miniature edition, .
Charity Appeals: The Complete Guide to Success.  Marion Allford Dent.  JM Dent & Institute of Fundraising Managers (1993).   .
The Builder Illustrations Index 1843–1883.  Ruth Richardson and Robert Thorne.  Builder Group plc & Hutton + Rostron (1994).   .
Giles 50th Annual, Carl Giles.  Pedigree Books (1996) 
Shakespeare's Window Into the Soul. Martin Lings. Publisher Inner Traditions (1996). Paperback:  .
World Reshaped – Fifty Years After the War in Europe: Volume 1, Royal United Services Institute for Defence and Security Studies (RUSI). Richard Cobbold, ed. Palgrave Macmillan (1996). .
Polo.  Susan Barrantes, author and photographer. Introduction by Juan Carlos Harriot. Buenos Aires: Ediciones Lariviere, Rizzoli International (1997). Hardcover: .
Historical Atlas of South-West England (Exeter Studies in Film History).  Roger Kain and William Ravenhill, eds.  Illustrated by  Helen Jones.     Exeter: University of Exeter Press (1999).  .
Hospice Without Walls.  Andrew Bibby.  Photographs by Ski Harrison.  Preface by Margaret Forster.  Calouste Gulbenkian Foundation (1999). Paperback: .
A Prayer for All Seasons: The Collects of the Book of Common Prayer. Introduction by Ian Curteis. Cambridge: Lutterworth Press (1999). .
Your Passport to Safer Travel (World Wise).  Mark Hodson.   Thomas Cook (2000). Paperback: .
The Bushmen of Southern Africa: Slaughter of the Innocent.  Sandy Gall.   Pimlico (2002). .
The Cancer Prevention Book: Holistic Guidelines From the World-Famous Bristol Cancer Help Centre.   Rosy Daniel and Rachel Ellis.    Hunter House Publishers (2002). Hardcover: .
The Apothecaries' Garden.  Sue Minter.  Stroud: Sutton Publishing (2003). .
La Mortella: An Italian Garden Paradise.  Susana Walton. Photographs by John Ferro Sims. New Holland Publishers (2003). .
An Entertaining Life.  Harry Secombe. London: Robson Books Ltd (2004). .
Fauna Britannica.  Stefan T. Buczacki. Hamlyn (2005). .
Royal Goldsmiths: The Art of Rundell & Bridge, 1797–1843. Christopher Hartop et al. Cambridge: John Adamson for Koopman Rare Art (2005). Paperback: . The net proceeds of the sale of this book benefit the Prince's Trust.
History and Landscape: The Guide to National Trust Properties in England, Wales and Northern Ireland. Lydia Greeves. National Trust Books (2006). Hardcover: .
Shakespeare's Sonnets and the Bible: A Spiritual Interpretation With Christian Sources. Ira B. Zinman.  Publisher, World Wisdom (2009). 
The Practice of Classical Architecture: The Architecture of Quinlan and Francis Terry, 2005–2015.<ref>[http://www.rizzoliusa.com/book.php?isbn=9780847844906 The Practice of Classical Architecture: The Architecture of Quinlan and Francis Terry, 2005-2015].</ref> David Watkin. New York: Rizzoli (2015). Hardcover: .Man of the Trees: Richard St. Barbe Baker, the First Global Conservationist. Paul Hanley. University of Regina Press (2018). Paperback: Encounters on the Holy Mountain: Stories from Mount Athos. Peter Howorth, Christopher Thomas. Turnhout: Brepols Publishers (2020). Lily's Promise: How I Survived Auschwitz and Found the Strength to Live. Lily Ebert, Dov Forman. Macmillan (2021). It's Up to Us: A Children's Terra Carta for Nature, People and Planet. Christopher Lloyd. What on Earth Publishing Ltd (2021). The Platinum Jubilee Cookbook. Ameer Kotecha. Jon Croft Editions (2022). 

IntroductionLiving Free.  H.A. Williams.  London: Continuum International Publishing Group Ltd. (2006). Paperback: , .

Preface
 Highgrove Florilegium: Watercolours depicting plants grown in the garden at Highgrove. Addision Publications (2008). .
 Wells Cathedral West Front: Construction, Sculpture and Conservation.   Jerry Sampson.  Foreword by Peter E. Lasko.  Stroud: Sutton Publishing (1998). , .  .Sealed by Time: The Loss and Recovery of the Mary Rose.  Vol. I: The Archaeology of the Mary Rose.  Peter Marsden, et al.  Mary Rose Trust Ltd (2003).  First of five volumes.  Hardcover: , .

Television documentaries writtenHarmony: A New Way of Looking at Our World, NBC 2010.The Prince and the Composer: A Film about Hubert Parry by HRH The Prince of Wales Dir. John Bridcut, BBC Four 2011.

Guest-editor
"HRH The Prince of Wales: Guest Editor". Country Life. 13 November 2013.
"HRH The Prince of Wales: Guest Editor". Country Life. 14 November 2018.
"HRH The Prince of Wales". The Voice''. 1 September 2022.

Articles written

References

Charles III
Charles III
 
Charles III